Amsin  is a town and Gram Panchayat in  Faizabad district (officially Ayodhya district) in the Indian state of Uttar Pradesh, India. Amsin is 43 km away from district headquarters Ayodhya city.

History
Amsin was a former revenue unit and administrative unit of the Muslim kingdoms and British Raj. Amsin consisted of several mouzas, which were the smallest revenue units. Parganas are equivalent to present day districts system. A very large area up to Faizabad was under the administration of Amsin Pargana. In late 16th century this pargana was conquered by Pugnacious Baruwars they occupied 159 villages of this pargana and established a separate Taluka Pali (Tandauli).

Geography
It has an average elevation of 315 ft.

Transport

Road
Amsin is situated on the way to Akbarpur road and is well connected to other cities, towns and markets.

Train
Goshainganj Railway Station is the nearest railway station which is 5 km away.

Air 
Maryada Purushottam Shriram International Airport (Ayodhya) is the nearest airport from Amsin, Ayodhya.

Nearby Places

There are two big lakes near Amsin namely  Darwan lake and  Bhadauna lake the former one is a greater lake.

Demographics
 India census, Amsin nagar panchayat had a population near about 10000. Males constitute about ~58% of the population and females about ~42%. Amsin has an average literacy rate of ~54%, lower than the national average of 59.5%: male literacy is 72%, and female literacy is 52%.

Education

Imamia Public School

See also
 Goshainganj Railway Station
 Faizabad Railway Station
 Akbarpur Railway Station
 Faizabad Airport
 Akbarpur Airport

References

 Cities and towns in Faizabad district